The Storm Rally (originally marketed as the SG Aviation Rallye) is a sport aircraft of composite construction developed in Italy in the 1990s.

Design and development
The Rally is a high-wing, strut-braced monoplane of conventional design and is marketed in factory-built or kit form. The cabin seats two, side-by-side, and the undercarriage is of fixed, tricycle configuration. The aircraft is available in two versions, one with a maximum takeoff weight of 450 kg (990 lb) in order to qualify as an ultralight under European Joint Aviation Authorities regulations and a "sport" version with a weight of 600 kg (1,320 lb) that qualifies as a special Light Sport Aircraft in the United States.

Specifications (Ultralight)

References

External links

Rally
1990s Italian sport aircraft
Homebuilt aircraft
Light-sport aircraft
Aircraft first flown in 1991